Wang San-tsai (Pinyin: Wáng Sān-cái; born 14 January 1965) is a Taiwanese fencer. He competed in the individual foil and épée events at the 1988 Summer Olympics. He temporarily withdrew from competition beginning in January 1989 after his doctors expressed concern that he might be suffering from deep-vein thrombosis.

References

External links
 

1965 births
Living people
Taiwanese male épée fencers
Olympic fencers of Taiwan
Fencers at the 1988 Summer Olympics
Taiwanese male foil fencers
20th-century Taiwanese people